The Autovía A-11 (also known as Autovía del Duero) is a highway in Spain,

It runs between Soria and Quintanilha in Portugal in the Rio Duero valley. It supersedes the N-122.

It is currently under construction.

References 

A-11
A-11